The Sternwheeler Jean is a historic steamboat that operated on the Willamette River, in the U.S. state of Oregon.  It is a -long tugboat (counting its paddle wheels, now removed), built in 1938 for the Western Transportation Company (a former Crown Zellerbach subsidiary) and in service until 1957. In August 1989, it was listed on the U.S. National Register of Historic Places in Nez Perce County, Idaho. At that time, it was located in Lewiston, Idaho, having been there since 1976. In Lewiston, its location changed from time to time, and  Hells Gate State Park was among the locations where Jean was moored.  As of 1997, it was still in Lewiston, afloat on the Snake River, but its operating equipment had been removed.  Its private owner at that time, the James River Corporation, sold the tug in 1998.  In July 2004, Jean was moved from Lewiston to Portland, Oregon.  Subsequently, its twin paddle wheels have been removed.

References

Further reading

External links

Paddle steamers of Oregon
Steam tugs
Steamboats of the Willamette River
1938 ships
Ships on the National Register of Historic Places in Oregon
National Register of Historic Places in Portland, Oregon
Tugboats of the United States